The Chapel Rural Historic District is an expansive rural historic district in Clarke County, Virginia. The district takes its name from the Old Chapel, an 18th-century building that stands prominently at the junction of several roads near the center of the district. The district includes nearly 700 contributing properties.

The district was listed on the National Register of Historic Places in 2014.

Gallery

References

Colonial Revival architecture in Virginia
Queen Anne architecture in Virginia
Historic districts in Clarke County, Virginia
National Register of Historic Places in Clarke County, Virginia
Historic districts on the National Register of Historic Places in Virginia